Apex (Inuktitut Niaqunngut) is a small community in Iqaluit located on Baffin Island in Nunavut, Canada. Historically Apex was the place where most Inuit lived when Iqaluit was a military site and off-limits to anyone not working at the base. The community is accessed by bridge or causeway, and bordered by a local creek (kuujuusi) and waterfall (kugluktuk). Located here are the women's shelter, a church, Nanook Elementary School, and a bed-and-breakfast, along with housing for about 60 families.

Officially and functionally part of the City of Iqaluit, some Apex residents tend to reject affiliation with "Frobisher Bay". At the 2006 Nunavut Electoral Boundaries Commission hearings, and in the resulting final report, community members asked for territorial representation with the south Baffin community of Kimmirut, rather than continue with parts of the existing Iqaluit ridings. The Deputy-Mayor of Iqaluit has the additional portfolio of representing and responding to interests from the Apex citizenry.

History
The community got its start in 1949 when the Hudson's Bay Company moved its south Baffin operations from Ward Inlet to the Apex Beach location to take advantage of the increased activity near the new US Air Force Base and landing strip. In the 1950s the community contained a number of administrative buildings for the Department of Northern Health and Welfare, as well as Inuit housing units, a public laundry and bath house and the original nursing station for the Baffin region. This latter facility acted as a marshalling and drop-off point for treatment in tuberculosis hospitals. A monument to Inuit who went south as tuberculosis patients, and did not return, was commissioned by Pairijait Tigumivik, (the Iqaluit Elders' Society) and is located in front of the nursing station on the bank of the creek. Small holes in the monument act as a 'prayer wall' designed to permit the insertion of messages for departed relatives.

The Inuit housing units which grew up in Apex were either in the single room "match-box" style with a pinched waist (1960s), or the 512 (named for the square footage of this housing model). The original Apex families, (including the Michael, Alainga, Peter, Joamie, Onalik and Timotee families) built these houses from standard packages supplied by government. There was also a small cannery for Arctic char, promoted by the Department of Fisheries and Oceans. The cannery encouraged fishing at levels which led to the demise of the Iqaluit Sylvia Grinnell River fish stocks, which are only now (~2008) showing signs of a recovery to levels which would substantiate the name "Iqaluit" for this region.

During the times of Commissioner of the Northwest Territories, Stu Hodgson, and his successor John H. Parker, residents of Apex were advised that the community was inefficient and no longer required. Plans were made for it to be "shut down" by government. A number of the Inuit housing units were moved to the airpost site at Frobisher Bay, including some which were relocated while their owners were away hunting. Government functions and employment gradually moved into the more "convenient" areas around the airport site, and the population of Apex declined. Municipal by-laws restricted new housing to existing residents until 1989, when construction was again permitted. The City of Iqaluit continues to prefer not to increase housing in Apex as it is serviced by more expensive "trucked water and sewer" systems.

Apex Hill has been used both as an alternate community name and as a geographic location for the hill on the east (seaward) side of the community which served as the apex (high point) for marine navigators entering Koojesse Inlet on the annual sealift and resupply.

St. Simon's Anglican Church, which was built in the sixties of the last century, was the first Anglican church in the area.

Climate
Apex, like Iqaluit, has a tundra climate (Köppen: ET) typical of the Arctic region, although it is well outside the Arctic Circle. The area features long, cold winters and brief, cool summers. Average monthly temperatures are below freezing for eight months of the year. Temperatures of the winter months are comparable to other northern communities further west on the continent such as Yellowknife and to some extent even Fairbanks, Alaska, even though Apex is a few degrees colder than the latter. Summer temperatures are, however, much colder due to its easterly maritime position affected by the waters of the cold Baffin Island Current. This means that the tree line is much further south in the eastern part of Canada, being as southbound, in spite of low elevation, as northern Labrador.

Although it is north of the natural tree line, there are some short, south-facing imported black spruce (Picea mariana) specimens protected by snowdrifts in the winter, in addition to a few shrubs, which are woody plants. These include the Arctic willow (Salix arctica), which is hard to recognize as a tree because of its low height.

The climate of Apex is also colder than Gulf Stream locations on the same latitude. For example, the Norwegian city of Trondheim has an annual mean temperature that is  milder.

References

External links

Hudson's Bay Company trading posts in Nunavut
Populated places in the Qikiqtaaluk Region
Iqaluit
Populated places established in 1949
1949 establishments in Canada